Bolshaya Ustyuba (Olo Östübä) is a rural locality (a selo) in Kopey-Kubovsky Selsoviet, Buzdyaksky District, Bashkortostan, Russia. The population was 345 as of 2010. There are 5 streets.

Geography 
Bolshaya Ustyuba is located 14 km west of Buzdyak (the district's administrative centre) by road. Ishtiryak is the nearest rural locality.

References 

Rural localities in Buzdyaksky District